The 28th TVyNovelas Awards is an Academy of special awards to the best soap operas and TV shows. The awards ceremony took place on March 14, 2010 in the Forum Mundo Imperial, Acapulco, Guerrero. The ceremony was televised in Mexico by Canal de las estrellas.

Yuri hosted the show. Sortilegio and Atrévete a soñar won 4 awards, the most for the evening. Other winners Hasta que el dinero nos separe won 3 awards, including Best Telenovela, En nombre del amor won 2 awards and Los exitosos Pérez, Mañana es para siempre, Mi pecado and Un gancho al corazón won one each.

Summary of awards and nominations

Winners and nominees

Novelas

Others

Special Event & Awards
Launching Stellar TVyNovelas: Paulina Goto
25 years Musical Career: Aleks Syntek
Career for 42 years of production: Enrique Segoviano
A Lifetime on the Stage: María Victoria

Performers

Missing
People who did not attend ceremony wing and were nominated in the shortlist in each category:
Aracely Arámbula
Emilio Larrosa
Fernando Colunga
Leticia Calderón (receives in place Karina Duprez)

References 

TVyNovelas Awards
TVyNovelas Awards
TVyNovelas Awards
TVyNovelas Awards ceremonies